Taurolema bellatrix is a species of beetle in the family Cerambycidae. It was described by James Thomson in 1860. It is known from Brazil and French Guiana.

References

Mauesiini
Beetles described in 1860